The Rural Municipality of Garry No. 245 is a rural municipality (RM) in the Canadian province of Saskatchewan within Census Division No. 9 and  Division No. 4.

History 
The RM of Garry No. 245 incorporated as a rural municipality on January 1, 1913.

Geography

Communities and localities 
The following unincorporated communities are within the RM.

Localities
 Beaver Dale
 Fitzmaurice
 Homefield
 Jedburgh
 Parkerview
 Rock Dell

Demographics 

Government 
The RM of Garry No. 245 is governed by an elected municipal council and an appointed administrator that meets on the second Tuesday of every month. The reeve of the RM is Allan Polegi while its administrator is Tanis Ferguson. The RM's office is located in Jedburgh.

Transportation 
 Saskatchewan Highway 52
 Saskatchewan Highway 617

See also 
List of rural municipalities in Saskatchewan

References 

G

Division No. 9, Saskatchewan